Hans-Joachim "HaJo" Geisler (born 27 May 1955) is a retired German swimmer who won a gold and a bronze medal at the 1975 World Aquatics Championships. He also competed at the 1972 and 1976 Summer Olympics. In 1972 his team finished fourth in the 4 × 200 m freestyle relay, 0.15 seconds short of a bronze medal. Between 1973 and 1978 he won eight national titles, including six in the 400 m individual medley event.

He received his bachelor's degree in Wolfsburg in 1974, and then between 1978 and 1984 studied at the RWTH Aachen University. Between 1987 and 1996 he worked at the Architekturbüro Karl-Heinz Schommer in Bonn and in 1997 founded his own architecture company in Niederkassel.

References

External links
Personal website

1955 births
Living people
Olympic swimmers of West Germany
Swimmers at the 1972 Summer Olympics
Swimmers at the 1976 Summer Olympics
Male medley swimmers
German male freestyle swimmers
German male swimmers
World Aquatics Championships medalists in swimming
People from Goslar
Sportspeople from Lower Saxony
21st-century German people
20th-century German people